Dessner is a surname. Notable people with the surname include:

Aaron Dessner (born 1976), American songwriter, multi-instrumentalist, and record producer
Bryce Dessner (born 1976), American composer and guitarist, twin brother of Aaron
Jeff Dessner, American ice hockey player